The one-way or measurement-based quantum computer (MBQC) is a method of quantum computing that first prepares an entangled resource state, usually a cluster state or graph state, then performs single qubit measurements on it.  It is "one-way" because the resource state is destroyed by the measurements.

The outcome of each individual measurement is random, but they are related in such a way that the computation always succeeds. In general the choices of basis for later measurements need to depend on the results of earlier measurements, and hence the measurements cannot all be performed at the same time.

The hardware implementation of MBQC mainly relies on photonic devices, thanks to the properties of entanglement between the photons. The process of entanglement and measurement can be described with the help of graph tools and group theory, in particular by the elements from the stabilizer group.

Definition

The purpose of quantum computing focuses on building an information theory with the features of quantum mechanics: instead of encoding a binary unit of information (bit), which can be switched to 1 or 0, a quantum binary unit of information (qubit) can simultaneously turn to be 0 and 1 at the same time, thanks to the phenomenon called superposition. Another key feature for quantum computing relies on the entanglement between the qubits.

In the quantum logic gate model, a set of qubits, called register, is prepared at the beginning of the computation, then a set of logic operations over the qubits, carried by unitary operators, is implemented. A quantum circuit is formed by a register of qubits on which unitary transformations are applied over the qubits. In the measurement-based quantum computation, instead of implementing a logic operation via unitary transformations, the same operation is executed by entangling a number  of input qubits with a cluster of  ancillary qubits, forming an overall source state of  qubits, and then measuring a number  of them. The remaining  output qubits will be affected by the measurements because of the entanglement with the measured qubits. The one-way computer has been proved to be a universal quantum computer, which means it can reproduce any unitary operation over an arbitrary number of qubits.

General procedure
The standard process of measurement-based quantum computing consists of three steps: entangle the qubits, measure the ancillae (auxiliary qubits) and correct the outputs. In the first step, the qubits are entangled in order to prepare the source state. In the second step, the ancillae are measured, affecting the state of the output qubits. However, the measurement outputs are non-deterministic result, due to undetermined nature of quantum mechanics: in order to carry on the computation in a deterministic way, some correction operators, called byproducts, are introduced.

Preparing the source state

At the beginning of the computation, the qubits can be distinguished into two categories: the input and the ancillary qubits. The inputs represent the qubits set in a generic  state, on which some unitary transformations are to be acted. In order to prepare the source state, all the ancillary qubits must be prepared in the  state:

.
Thereafter, the entanglement between two qubits can be performed by applying a  gate operation. The matrix representation of such two-qubits operator is given by

The action of a  gate over two qubits can be described by the following system:

When applying a  gate over two ancillae in the  state, the overall state 

turns to be an entangled pair of qubits. When entangling two ancillae, no importance is given about which is the control qubit and which one the target, as far as the outcome turns to be the same. Similarly, as the  gates are represented in a diagonal form, they all commute each other, and no importance is given about which qubits to entangle first. Photons are the most common source to prepare entangled physical qubits.

Measuring the qubits

The process of measurement over a single-particle state can be described by projecting the state on the eigenvector of an observable. Measuring the -th qubit by the  observable means to project the  state over the eigenvectors of :
.
The measurement projection can be performed over the eigenstates of the  observable:
,
where  and  belong to the Pauli matrices. In the one-way quantum computing, once a qubit has been measured, there is no way to recycle it in the flow of computation. Therefore, instead of using the  notation, it is common to find  to indicate a projective measurement over the -th qubit.

Correcting the output

After all the measurements have been performed, the system has been reduced to a smaller number of qubits, which form the output state of the system. In order to perform a deterministic computation, some corrections must be introduced. The correction operators, or byproduct operators, are applied to the output qubits after all the measurements have been performed. In the first case, no correction will occur, in the latter one a  operator will be implemented on the -th qubit. Eventually, even though the outcome of a measurement is not deterministic in quantum mechanics, the results from measurements can be used in order to perform corrections, and carry on a deterministic computation.

CME pattern

The operations of entanglement, measurement and correction can be performed in order to implement unitary gates. Such operations can be performed time by time for any logic gate in the circuit, or rather in a pattern which allocates all the entanglement operations at the beginning, the measurements in the middle and the corrections at the end of the circuit. Such pattern of computation is referred to as CME standard pattern. The same notation holds for the  byproducts.

An example: Euler rotations

As an illustrative example, consider the Euler rotation in the  basis: such operation, in the gate model of quantum computation, is described as
,
where  are the angles for the rotation, while  defines a global phase which is irrelevant for the computation. To perform such operation in the one-way computing frame, it is possible to implement the following CME pattern:
,
where the input state  is the qubit , all the other qubits are auxiliary ancillae and therefore have to be prepared in the  state. In the first step, the input state  must be entangled with the second qubits; in turn, the second qubit must be entangled with the third one and so on. The entangling operations  between the qubits can be performed by the  gates.

In the second place, the first and the second qubits must be measured by the  observable, which means they must be projected onto the eigenstates  of such observable. The first measurement  is performed on the qubit  with a  angle, which means it has to be projected onto the  states. The second measurement  is performed with respect to the  angle, i.e. the second qubit has to be projected on the  state. However, if the outcome from the previous measurement has been , the sign of the  angle has to be flipped, and the second qubit will be projected to the  state; if the outcome from the first measurement has been , no flip needs to be performed. The same operations have to be repeated for the third  and the fourth  measurements, according to the respective angles and sign flips. The sign over the  angle is set to be . Eventually the fifth qubit (the only one not to be measured) figures out to be the output state.

At last, the corrections  over the output state have to be performed via the byproduct operators.

As seen in such example, in the measurement-based computation model, the physical input qubit (the first one) and output qubit (the third one) may differ each other.

Equivalence between quantum circuit model and MBQC

The one-way quantum computer allows the implementation of a circuit of unitary transformations through the operations of entanglement and measurement. At the same time, any quantum circuit can be in turn converted into a CME pattern: a technique to translate quantum circuits into a MBQC pattern of measurements has been formulated by V. Danos et al.

The  single-qubit operator is defined as follows:
.
The  can be converted into a CME pattern as follows:

which means, to implement a  operator, the input qubits  must be entangled with an ancilla qubit , therefore the input must be measured on the - plane, thereafter the output qubit is corrected by the  byproduct. Once every  gate has been decomposed into the CME pattern, the operations in the overall computation will consist of  entanglements,  measurements and  corrections. In order to lead the whole flow of computation to a CME pattern, some rules are provided.

Standardization

In order to move all the  entanglements at the beginning of the process, some rules of commutation must be pointed out:

.
The entanglement operator  commutes with the  Pauli operators and with any other operator  acting on a qubit , but not with the  Pauli operators acting on the -th or -th qubits.

Pauli simplification

The measurement operations  commute with the corrections in the following manner:

,

where . Such operation means that, when shifting the  corrections at the end of the pattern, some dependencies between the measurements may occur. The  operator is called signal shifting, whose action will be explained in the next paragraph. For particular  angles, some simplifications, called Pauli simplifications, can be introduced:

.

Signal shifting

The action of the signal shifting operator  can be explained through its rules of commutation:

.

If no  appears in the  sequence, no substitution will occur. To perform a correct CME pattern, every signal shifting operator  must be translated at the end of the pattern.

Stabilizer formalism

When preparing the source state of entangled qubits, a graph representation can be given by the stabilizer group. The stabilizer group  is an abelian subgroup from the Pauli group , which one can be described by its generators . A stabilizer state is a -qubit state  which is a unique eigenstate for the generators  of the  stabilizer group:

Of course, .

It is therefore possible to define a  qubit graph state  as a quantum state associated with a graph, i.e. a set  whose vertices  correspond to the qubits, while the edges  represent the entanglements between the qubits themselves.
,
where  stands for all the  qubits neighboring with the -th one, i.e. the  vertices linked by a  edge with the  vertex. Each  generator commute with all the others. A graph composed by  vertices can be described by  generators from the stabilizer group:

.

The Clifford group

The Clifford group  is composed by elements which leave invariant the elements from the Pauli's group :
.
.

Consider a state  which is stabilized by a set of stabilizers . Acting via an element  from the Clifford group on such state, the following equalities hold:

.

Such operation may give rise to different representations for the  generators of the stabilizer group.

The Gottesman–Knill theorem states that, given a set of logic gates from the Clifford group, followed by  measurements, such computation can be efficiently simulated on a classical computer in the strong sense, i.e. a computation which elaborates in a polynomial-time the probability  for a given output  from the circuit.

Hardware and applications

Topological cluster state quantum computer
Measurement-based computation on a periodic 3D lattice cluster  state can be used to implement topological quantum error correction. Topological cluster state computation is closely related to Kitaev's toric code, as the 3D topological cluster state can be constructed and measured over time by a repeated sequence of gates on a 2D array.

Implementations
One-way quantum computation has been demonstrated by running the 2 qubit Grover's algorithm on a 2x2 cluster state of photons.  A linear optics quantum computer based on one-way computation has been proposed.

Cluster states have also been created in optical lattices, but were not used for computation as the atom qubits were too close together to measure individually.

AKLT state as a resource
It has been shown that the (spin ) AKLT state on a 2D honeycomb lattice can be used as a resource for MBQC.
More recently it has been shown that a spin-mixture AKLT state can be used as a resource.

See also

 Quantum gate teleportation
 Continuous-variable quantum information
 Quantum algorithm
 Quantum logic gate
 Linear optical quantum computing
 Quantum optics
 Quantum error correction
 Quantum Turing machine
 Adiabatic quantum computation

References

General

  Non-cluster resource states
  Measurement-based quantum computation, quantum carry-lookahead adder

Quantum information science
Information theory
Models of computation